Harutaeographa izabella is a moth of the family Noctuidae. It is found in Nepal.

References

Moths described in 1998
Orthosiini